is the sixth single by Japanese pop singer Miho Komatsu, released under Amemura O-Town Record label.. It was released 14 October 1998. It reached #5 rank for first week and sold 54,760 copies. It charted for 14 weeks and totally sold 162,420 copies.

Track listing
All songs are written and composed by Miho Komatsu and arranged by Hirohito Furui

OA (on air) version, single and album version have different arrangements. OA version was never officially released in any CDs.
"One Side Love"
 (instrumental)
"One Side Love" (instrumental)

Usage in media
Kōri no ue ni Tatsu yō ni
for Anime television series Case Closed (Detective Conan) as 6th ending theme

References 

1998 singles
1998 songs
Miho Komatsu songs
Being Inc. singles
Amemura-O-Town Record singles
Case Closed songs
Songs written by Miho Komatsu
Song recordings produced by Daiko Nagato